John Lawrence McDonald (August 6, 1894 – February 26, 1969) was an Ontario farmer and political figure. He represented Stormont in the Legislative Assembly of Ontario from 1943 to 1945 and from 1948 to 1951 as a Progressive Conservative member.

He was born in Cornwall Township, Ontario. McDonald served as reeve for the township and was also warden for the United Counties of Stormont, Dundas and Glengarry. He was an unsuccessful candidate for the federal seat in 1953. He died in 1969.

References

External links 

Stormont, Dundas and Glengarry : a history, 1784-1945, JG Harkness (1946)

1894 births
1969 deaths
People from the United Counties of Stormont, Dundas and Glengarry
Progressive Conservative Party of Ontario MPPs